Kenneth Clement Yates (born 4 August 1938) is a former cricketer who played first-class and List A cricket in England.  Yates was a right-handed batsman and wicketkeeper. He was born at Keetmanshoop in what was then South-West Africa.

In 1961, Yates played a single first-class match for Cambridge University against the Free Foresters.  In the match he batted once, remaining unbeaten on 0 and taking 3 catches behind the stumps.

In 1963, he played a single Minor Counties Championship match for Cambridgeshire against Wiltshire.

The following year, Yates played in a List A match for Cambridgeshire against Essex in the 1964 Gillette Cup.  In his only List A match, he scored five runs but did not make any dismissals.

References

External links
Kenneth Yates at Cricinfo
Kenneth Yates at CricketArchive

1938 births
Living people
Namibian people of British descent
White Namibian people
People from Keetmanshoop
Namibian cricketers
Cambridge University cricketers
Cambridgeshire cricketers
Wicket-keepers